Gisela Jäger was a German rower who won three gold and one silver medals in the double sculls at the European championships of 1968–1971, together with Rita Schmidt. Nationally, she won all single scull titles between 1957 and 1965, as well as double sculls in 1968–1971. She later married the rower Achim Hill.

References

Year of birth missing (living people)
Living people
East German female rowers
European Rowing Championships medalists